Greater Sudbury City Council is the governing body of the City of Greater Sudbury, Ontario, Canada.

The council consists of the mayor plus a twelve-person council. The city is divided into twelve wards; each ward is represented by one councillor. The council meets at Tom Davies Square.

The city was created by amalgamating the former City of Sudbury with six suburban municipalities on January 1, 2001. Initially, the council structure consisted of six wards, each represented by two councillors. Ward boundaries in the new city were drawn by grouping former suburban municipalities with adjacent neighbourhoods in the former city. For the 2006 municipal election, council was reorganized into twelve single-member wards.

Past mayors of the city and the former suburban municipalities are listed at List of mayors of Sudbury, Ontario.

2000-2003
Council elected in the 2000 municipal election:

2003-2006
Council elected in the 2003 municipal election:

2006-2010
Council elected in the 2006 municipal election:

2010-2014
Council elected in the 2010 municipal election.

As the vacancies in wards 1 and 8 occurred less than six months prior to the 2014 municipal election, by provincial law both were required to be filled by temporary appointment to the seat rather than in a conventional by-election. Sizer was appointed on June 26 to succeed Belli, and McIntaggart was appointed on July 8 to succeed Cimino. Unlike many cities in similar circumstances, Greater Sudbury City Council opted not to impose a requirement that the appointed councillors could not run for reelection in 2014; Sizer chose to run as a candidate and won reelection, while McIntaggart did not run.

2014-2018
Council elected in the 2014 municipal election.

2018-2022
Council elected in the 2018 municipal election.

2022-2026
Council elected in the 2022 municipal election.

Ward boundaries

 Ward 1: Gatchell, Robinson, the West End, Copper Park, Moonglo, South of Ontario St., and West of Regent St.
 Ward 2: Walden (Whitefish, Naughton, Lively, Worthington), Copper Cliff
 Ward 3: Onaping Falls (Onaping, Levack, Dowling), Chelmsford, Hull, Larchwood
 Ward 4: Azilda, Bélanger, Simard, Elm West, Donovan
 Ward 5: Val Caron, Blezard Valley, Nickeldale, Cambrian Heights Guilletville, Notre Dame, LaSalle area west of Rideau
 Ward 6: Val Thérèse, Hanmer
 Ward 7: Garson, Falconbridge, Skead, Capreol
 Ward 8: New Sudbury (east of Barry Downe Rd.)
 Ward 9: Coniston, Wahnapitae, Wanup, McFarlane Lake, South End
 Ward 10: Lockerby, Lo-Ellen, University Area, Kingsmount, Bell Park, Downtown (south of Elm Street)
 Ward 11: Minnow Lake, New Sudbury (west of Barry Downe Road, east of Arthur St, south of Lasalle Blvd.)
 Ward 12: Flour Mill, Downtown (north of Elm Street), New Sudbury (east of Rideau Street, west of Barry Downe Road & north of Lasalle Blvd.), Kingsway-Bancroft area

Former boundaries

From amalgamation in 2001 until reorganization in 2005, the wards were as follows:

 Ward 1: former Town of Walden, plus the communities of Copper Cliff, Gatchell, Robinson and the West End in the former city of Sudbury.
 Ward 2: former Towns of Rayside-Balfour and Onaping Falls, and the northwestern corner of old Sudbury.
 Ward 3: former City of Valley East, New Sudbury west of Rideau Street and the Cambrian Heights neighbourhood.
 Ward 4: former Town of Capreol, the northern half (Garson-Skead) of the former Town of Nickel Centre, the newly annexed geographic townships north and east of Lake Wanapitei, and New Sudbury east of Barry Downe Road.
 Ward 5: southern half (Coniston-Wahnapitae) of the former Town of Nickel Centre, the downtown core, most of the former Sudbury south of Ramsey Lake, and the newly annexed townships south of the former Regional Municipality.
 Ward 6: the only ward whose boundaries lay entirely within the old City of Sudbury, included the Flour Mill, Minnow Lake, Adamsdale and New Sudbury between Barrydowne Road and Rideau Street.

References

External links
 Greater Sudbury City Council

Municipal councils in Ontario